Maire Aunaste (née Ütt, born November 7, 1953) is an Estonian journalist.

Aunaste's father was Helmut-Endel Ütt and her mother's maiden name was Kalaus. She is the oldest of three siblings; her youngest sister is actress Eva Püssa and the middle sister is Tiina Prentsel.

She was an Estonian Television presenter for eight years, and news reporter for Aktuaalne kaamera. For a total of 10 years, she was hosting an Eesti Televisioon entertainment show Out With You, and Kanal 2's We.

April 27, 2005 in a poll published by the magazine Week, Aunaste was selected as the second best TV host with 626 votes, after Anu Välba, and before Eda-Ines Etti. 
In 2007, she came in second again in the same election, and this time Anu Välba was first and Aigi Vahing (:et) third.

In 2015 parliamentary election, Aunaste was chosen to the parliament with 679 individual votes.

Work on the radio
 2004 - "Tuesdays with you" Vikerraadio culture program.

Work in print
 Maire Aunaste is one of the founders of the magazine Kroonika and was its first editor-in-chief.
 In the magazine Naised, she wrote about her life in America. Later these stories were published as a book Viis aastat peidus (Five years in hiding).
 Has been a weekly columnist in Õhtuleht.
 A columnist in Maaleht.

Fiction
Maire Aunaste has written three books:

 "Iseennast kuulates" (Listening to yourself,) BNS,   - The book is based on the texts of the Radio 2 broadcasts: "Only Love" and "Frankly about life". The tenet of this book is that absolutely all people want to be special.
 "Viis aastat peidus", (Five years in hiding,) Magazine Publishers Ltd. 2008,   - Book one of the Estonian TV presenter's life in the United States. What life really means to be illegal, if there are no official residence and work permit? How to earn the daily bread procurement, who was known as the home television, but now the only mention of human rights worker in the primary? "After these experiences I know that now there is nothing that can degrade me." says the author herself.
 "Mitte ainult meestest", (Not only about men), 2009

Awards
 Häädemeeste municipality Freeman

Personal life
She has been married twice. Her daughter Elis is a journalist.

References

1953 births
Living people
Estonian journalists
Estonian women journalists
Estonian television personalities
University of Tartu alumni
Women members of the Riigikogu
Members of the Riigikogu, 2015–2019
21st-century Estonian women politicians